Teodor Sillman  (17 January 1854 in Helsinki - 12 March 1926 in Gatchina, St. Petersburg) was a Finnish politician. He was a member of the Senate of Finland.

Finnish senators
1854 births
1926 deaths
Politicians from Helsinki